Elections to Banbridge District Council were held on 5 May 2011 on the same day as the other Northern Irish local government elections. The election used three district electoral areas to elect a total of 17 councillors.

Election results

Note: "Votes" are the first preference votes.

Districts summary

|- class="unsortable" align="centre"
!rowspan=2 align="left"|Ward
! % 
!Cllrs
! % 
!Cllrs
! %
!Cllrs
! %
!Cllrs
! % 
!Cllrs
! %
!Cllrs
!rowspan=2|TotalCllrs
|- class="unsortable" align="center"
!colspan=2 bgcolor="" | UUP
!colspan=2 bgcolor="" | DUP
!colspan=2 bgcolor="" | SDLP
!colspan=2 bgcolor="" | Sinn Féin
!colspan=2 bgcolor="" | Alliance
!colspan=2 bgcolor="white"| Others
|-
|align="left"|Banbridge Town
|bgcolor="40BFF5"|36.3
|bgcolor="40BFF5"|2
|30.8
|2
|11.6
|1
|7.4
|0
|8.2
|1
|5.7
|0
|6
|-
|align="left"|Dromore
|26.0
|2
|bgcolor="#D46A4C"|44.2
|bgcolor="#D46A4C"|2
|8.3
|0
|10.2
|1
|7.0
|0
|4.3
|0
|5
|-
|align="left"|Knockiveagh
|bgcolor="40BFF5"|38.6
|bgcolor="40BFF5"|3
|23.0
|1
|19.1
|1
|16.0
|1
|0.0
|0
|3.3
|0
|6
|- class="unsortable" class="sortbottom" style="background:#C9C9C9"
|align="left"| Total
|33.8
|7
|32.4
|5
|13.2
|2
|11.4
|2
|4.9
|1
|4.3
|0
|17
|-
|}

Districts results

Banbridge Town

2005: 2 x UUP, 2 x DUP, 1 x SDLP, 1 x Alliance
2011: 2 x UUP, 2 x DUP, 1 x SDLP, 1 x Alliance
2005-2011 Change: No change

Dromore

2005: 3 x DUP, 1 x UUP, 1 x SDLP
2011: 2 x DUP, 2 x UUP, 1 x Sinn Féin
2005-2011 Change: UUP and Sinn Féin gain from DUP and SDLP

Knockiveagh

2005: 2 x UUP, 2 x DUP, 1 x SDLP, 1 x Sinn Féin
2011: 3 x UUP, 1 x DUP, 1 x SDLP, 1 x Sinn Féin
2005-2011 Change: UUP gain from DUP

References

Banbridge District Council elections
Banbridge